Plot No. 5 is a 1981 Indian Hindi-language drama thriller film directed by Yogesh Saxena and produced by Jerooant Yogesh. This film was released on 23 January 1981 under the banner of Visual Productions. It was released after the death of Uttam Kumar, one of the key actors of the film.

Plot
The plot revolves around a series of mysterious murders where the victims are young ambitious girls. Police officer Khan discovers that all the murders are committed near the house named Plot No. 5.  Two brothers, Ajay and Sanjay Sinha, live there with a servant. One of them is a paraplegic who is unable to move. Mr Verma, a friend of the Sinha brothers and a family doctor often comes there. The police suspect all of them.

Cast
 Uttam Kumar as Sanjay
 Amol Palekar as Ajay
 Pradeep Kumar as Doctor
 Vidya Sinha
 Vikas Anand
 Sarika as Sarita
 Amjad Khan as Inspector Khan
 Shreeram Lagoo as Verma
 Viju Khote
Benjamin Gilani as Rahul
 Komilla Wirk as Nikki
 Maruti Rao as Cristo

Music
Salil Choudhury was the music director of the film. This is the only film where Chowdhury scored the background music, as well as a disco song Chic Chic Chica Chica.

References

External links
 

1981 films
1980s Hindi-language films
Films scored by Salil Chowdhury
Indian detective films
Indian thriller drama films
1980s thriller drama films